Louis-Henri Albinet (19 July 1898 – 22 July 1991) was a French athlete. He competed in the men's long jump at the 1924 Summer Olympics.

References

External links
 

1898 births
1991 deaths
Athletes (track and field) at the 1924 Summer Olympics
French male long jumpers
Olympic athletes of France